Coal Creek may refer to:

Australia 
Coal Creek, Queensland, a locality in the Somerset Region
Coal Creek, Victoria, a town

Canada 
Coal Creek (British Columbia), a creek
Coal Creek, British Columbia, a ghost town

United States

Populated places
 Coal Creek Historic Mining District, in Coal Creek, Alaska
 Coal Creek, Boulder County, Colorado, a census-designated place
 Coal Creek, Fremont County, Colorado, a town
 Coal Creek, Indiana, an unincorporated community
 Coal Creek Station, a power plant in North Dakota
 Rocky Top, Tennessee, originally named Coal Creek
 Coal Creek, Washington, an unincorporated community

Rivers and streams
 Coal Creek (Henry County, Missouri), creek in Missouri
 Coal Creek (Susquehanna River), creek in Pennsylvania
 Mahanoy Creek, known locally as Coal Creek, Pennsylvania
 Coal Creek (Clinch River tributary), a tributary stream of the Clinch River in Tennessee
 Coal Creek (Iron County, Utah) a stream in Cedar Valley, Utah
 Coal Creek (Washington), a creek in Seattle, Washington

Geology
 Coal Creek Serpentinite (Texas geology), a piece of Precambrian oceanic crust exposed in central, Texas

Other 
 Coal Creek (novel), a 2013 novel by Alex Miller